Haji Public School is a not-for-profit progressive school started in 2009 by the Haji family in their ancestral village Breswana, in the Doda district of Jammu and Kashmir in Northern India. It specifically caters to low income farming families which make up the most of the local populace in the high mountains of the Doda District. The school is a registered K-10 institute, affiliated with JKBOSE. The school serves children from over 30 mountain villages, and operates on a low cost, high academic standard formula. The school is privately funded by the Haji family, friends and online donations.

History 
In 2008, Sabbah Haji moved back from Bengaluru to her native village Breswana. There, she saw that nearly two generations of villagers had no education, due to the apathetic attitude of successive governments and militancy. At over 7,500 feet, with no motorable access to the rest of the state, this mountain region's education has languished in the past few decades. Although government schools did exist in the area, Sabbah dismissed them as hopeless and inefficient, lacking faculties, teachers and turning out 'degree students who could not read'. Her family wanted to provide these children with an education that would allow them to compete on equal grounds with the rest of the world. And thus, the Haji Public School was born in 2009.

The school was built on land donated by her family and was initially set up under the 'Haji Amina Charity Trust' in Doda, founded by Mr Nasir Haji. It now functions under the 'Haji Education Foundation', a separate organization set up in 2011 specifically to promote education in the region. The Haji Education Foundation trustees are Mohd Saleem Haji, Tasneem Haji, and Sabbah Haji. The Trust is also funded by donations from various members of the family and friends.

Since it started on 4 May 2009, the Haji Public School has just one objective – "to impart knowledge to those children who cannot avail of the academic facilities being provided to others, in more accessible cities". The cause was so strong that the village inhabitants helped build the school brick by brick. The villagers have brought up materials for the school on their backs. They wrote a petition which allowed the Haji family to start a school. Over the winter of 2008, Sabbah Haji and her mother, Tasneem Haji, trained two boys from the village in order to turn them into teachers. With no building to call their own initially, they worked out of two rooms in their ancestral house itself. They started at the ground level, teaching only the lower and upper kindergarten students. The first class at the Haji Public School comprised 25 kids.

The school has its own building and it is growing every year. , the school has over 350 students. The school has expanded its branches further in nearest villages such as Persholla and Shadiwan.

Location 
Haji Public School is located in the village Breswana, of Doda district in Jammu and Kashmir.

Volunteers 
Due to lack of qualified teachers in and around village for the higher standard students, the proper volunteer program was started in year 2012. Apart from the few regular teaching staff, the school relies heavily on the volunteers coming in from all around the world to teach the kids. The local staff members are capable of teaching until the second grade only. The school has over 20 teaching staff, including full-time local teachers as well as long term Indian and international teaching volunteers. The volunteers, who live among the villagers, teach for a period of three months. They are not paid, but they are provided with food and lodging. 
Till December 2016, Haji Public School has had over 62 teaching volunteers from Canada, Singapore, the US, South Africa, France and India. Several of them have returned for multiple long-term stints with Haji Public School since they find themselves invested in and attached to the students and the work to be genuinely satisfying.

Facilities and fees 
The campus includes a basketball court, computer lab, library, playground, and wall climbing area. The school charges a monthly tuition. Its books and paper supplies are funded by the Amin Trust.

Social media 
Sabbah Haji uses her own and her family's personal contacts and also actively promotes her school on sites such as Facebook, Instagram, Tumblr, and blogs/school websites to attract not just volunteers but also donations in cash and kind. She used social media to raise awareness of the existence of her school by sharing pictures and videos, which led to an influx of volunteers and even necessary equipment from across the world. Sabbah Haji represents the school outside, on social media and at various conferences. At CONVERGE 2016, YKA's flagship event, Haji shared her story through a series of photos.

References

External links 
 

Non-profit organisations based in India
Charities based in India
Schools in Jammu and Kashmir
Volunteer organisations in India